Falling Creek Falls is a  waterfall on  jointly managed by the Suwannee River Water Management District and Columbia County, Florida. and is not currently a State Park.  Located north of Lake City, Florida, boardwalk access to the waterfall starts at a parking lot located on the east-side of County Road 131 just north of the 441/I-10 interchange.  The park's address and boardwalk trailhead is at 953 Northwest Falling Creek Road, Lake City, FL 32055.  Falling Creek Falls was opened to the public in October 2001 as a joint project between the Suwannee River Water Management District and Columbia County after the property was purchased from the Parker & Hogan families "to protect and preserve the Falls for present and future generations".

See also
List of Florida state parks
List of Florida state forests
Southwest Florida Water Management District

References

Further reading
Falling Creek Falls ap
Falling Creek Falls map legend

Landforms of Columbia County, Florida
Tourist attractions in Columbia County, Florida
Waterfalls of Florida
Suwannee River Water Management District reserves
Protected areas of Columbia County, Florida